The UniverSoul Circus is a single ring circus, established in 1994 by Cedric Walker and Calvin "Casual Cal" Dupree, an African-American man who had a vision of creating a circus with a large percentage of people of color performing. He began searching for people from all around the world with incredible talents. It is headquartered in Atlanta, Georgia.

History 
The UniverSoul Circus was founded in 1994. The history section of the official website states that "We had the idea to present ... to a wide demographic of spectators."

Recruiting, training and production began in 1993. The first performance took place in 1994 in the parking lot of Atlanta Fulton County Stadium, a couple of years before the stadium closed and demolished the following year. The first season of operations brought formidable debt upon the organization. By 1997 the circus tour grew to 10 cities, 19 cities in 1999, 31 cities in 2000, and 32 cities in 2005. An Emmy Award-winning special featuring the circus debuted in 1998 on cable TV network HBO. A tour of South Africa, the first international destination, was completed in 2001.

UniverSoul Circus through some of its animal vendors has had several animal cruelty allegations dating from 1997 to the present time. It also has had incidents of animals escaping.

References

Notes 

Circuses